The Southern (Spring) Open was a golf tournament on the PGA Tour, played only in 1922 at the New Orleans Country Club in New Orleans, Louisiana. Gene Sarazen won the event with a four-round total of 294 (+10), beating Leo Diegel by eight strokes. It was Sarazen's first PGA Tour win.

See also
Zurich Classic of New Orleans, the later PGA Tour event held in New Orleans

References

Former PGA Tour events
Golf in New Orleans
Golf
1922 in Louisiana